Coleotechnites blastovora is a moth of the family Gelechiidae. It is found in North America, where it has been recorded from Quebec, Alberta, British Columbia, New Brunswick and Saskatchewan.

The larvae feed on Picea and Abies species, occasionally mining the needles of their host plant.

References

Moths described in 1962
Coleotechnites